Gal Gah (also Romanized as Gal Gāh; also known as Kal Gāh) is a village in Javid-e Mahuri Rural District, in the Central District of Mamasani County, Fars Province, Iran. At the 2006 census, its population was 123, in 25 families.

References 

Populated places in Mamasani County